Storkow may refer to:

Storkow, Brandenburg, Germany, a town
Storkow (Mark) station, a railway station
Storkow Castle
Storkow, Mecklenburg-Vorpommern, Germany, location of a windmill in Mecklenburg-Vorpommern